Maksim Andreyevich Zimarev (born 8 November 1989) is a Russian former professional football player.

Club career
He made his Russian Football National League debut for FC Torpedo Vladimir on 4 April 2011 in a game against FC Alania Vladikavkaz.

External links
 

1989 births
People from Vladimir, Russia
Living people
Russian footballers
Association football midfielders
FC Tyumen players
FC Tekstilshchik Ivanovo players
FC Torpedo Vladimir players
Sportspeople from Vladimir Oblast